Brian Matthew Minto (born January 27, 1975) is an American former professional boxer who competed from 2002 to 2016. He challenged once for the WBO cruiserweight title in 2010.

Professional career
Minto turned pro in 2002 and won his first 8 bouts, gaining the West Virginia heavyweight boxing title.

In 2004, Minto had a bout with former champion Tony Tubbs.  The inactive Tubbs won in a mild upset, giving Minto his first professional loss.  Minto has been featured on ESPN fight cards, where he scored  two TKOs over Vincent Maddalone.

In November 2006, Minto scored an upset win (TKO in the sixth round) over Axel Schulz, foiling the German's comeback attempt. Minto's second defeat came from one-time WBO contender Luan Krasniqi March 17 in Germany.

On July 2, 2008, at Pullman Park in his hometown of Butler, Minto defeated John Poore by first-round technical knockout. Minto knocked Poore down three times before the bout was stopped.

After his fight with John Poore he fought Galen Brown on November 1, 2008 and defeated him by fourth-round knockout after his original opponent Marcus McGee pulled out due to a shoulder injury.

He fought Matt Greer on April 17, 2009 in a fight which he won by unanimous decision.

He fought Donnell Holmes on August 14, 2009 for the interim WBO NABO Heavyweight Title in which he won a technical decision after the fight was stopped on four rounds the judges gave Minto the decision with the scores of 40–36, 39–37, and 39–37 and it was also Holmes first loss of his career.

Brian Minto fought Chris Arreola, December 5, 2009 as an under card for the Paul Williams vs Sergio Martinez fight. After getting hit constantly with right hands he was dropped in the 4th round. He stood up at 8 and proceeded to get hit with more clean right hands from Arreola before being dropped again. Minto rose at 9 and the referee stopped the fight as he appeared to be in no condition to proceed with the fight.

On March 22, Minto announced he would be moving down to the Cruiserweight division to challenge Marco Huck for the WBO Cruiserweight Title. Minto was defeated by Huck by a 10th round (end of nine) RTD.

Personal life
Brian has a wife named Heidi and has two children. A daughter Megan and a son Matthew.

Professional boxing record 

|-
|align="center" colspan=8|53 fights, 42 wins (27 knockouts), 11 losses (6 knockouts)
|-
| align="center" style="border-style: none none solid solid; background: #e3e3e3"|Result
| align="center" style="border-style: none none solid solid; background: #e3e3e3"|Record
| align="center" style="border-style: none none solid solid; background: #e3e3e3"|Opponent
| align="center" style="border-style: none none solid solid; background: #e3e3e3"|Type
| align="center" style="border-style: none none solid solid; background: #e3e3e3"|Round
| align="center" style="border-style: none none solid solid; background: #e3e3e3"|Date
| align="center" style="border-style: none none solid solid; background: #e3e3e3"|Location
| align="center" style="border-style: none none solid solid; background: #e3e3e3"|Notes
|-align=center
|Win
|42–11
|align=left| András Csomor
|TKO
|5 
|17/09/2016
|align=left| Kelly Automotive Park, Butler, Pennsylvania
|align=left|
|-align=center
|Loss
|41–11
|align=left| Edmund Gerber
|TKO
|2 
|05/03/2016
|align=left| Colosseum Sport Hall, Grozny
|align=left|
|-align=center
|Loss
|41–10
|align=left| Dillian Whyte
|TKO
|3 
|12/09/2015
|align=left| Millennium Dome, London
|align=left|
|-align=center
|Loss
|41–9
|align=left| Israel Adesanya
|SD
|3 
|28/03/2015
|align=left| Horncastle Arena, Christchurch
|align=left|
|-align=center
|Win
|41–8
|align=left| Daniel Ammann
|UD
|3 
|28/03/2015
|align=left| Horncastle Arena, Christchurch
|align=left|
|-align=center
|Win
|40–8
|align=left| Monty Filimaea
|TKO
|2 
|28/03/2015
|align=left| Horncastle Arena, Christchurch
|align=left|
|-align=center
|Loss
|39–8
|align=left| Joseph Parker
|RTD
|7 
|05/17/2014
|align=left| Vodafone Events Centre, Manukau
|align=left|
|-align=center
|Win
|39–7
|align=left| Shane Cameron
|RTD
|7 
|14/12/2013
|align=left| Auckland
|align=left|
|-align=center
|Win
|38–7
|align=left| Tom Little 
|SD
|3 
|14/11/2013
|align=left| London
|align=left|
|-align=center
|Loss
|37–7
|align=left| Michael Sprott
|UD
|3 
|14/11/2013
|align=left| London
|align=left|
|-align=center
|Loss
|37–6
|align=left| Artur Szpilka
|UD
|10 
|15/06/2013
|align=left| Bydgoszcz
|align=left|
|-align=center
|Win
|37–5
|align=left| Mike Sheppard 
|TKO
|4 
|18/08/2012
|align=left| Mountaineer Casino Racetrack and Resort, Chester, West Virginia
|align=left|
|-align=center
|Win
|36–5
|align=left| Matt Hicks
|TKO
|1 
|28/04/2012
|align=left| Mountaineer Casino Racetrack and Resort, Chester, West Virginia
|align=left|
|-align=center
|Loss
|35–5
|align=left| Tony Grano
|TKO
|3 
|28/01/2012
|align=left| Turning Stone Resort & Casino, Verona, New York
|align=left|
|-align=center
|Win
|35–4
|align=left| Pierre Karam
|RTD
|2 
|29/10/2010
|align=left| Ghost Riders’ Entertainment Complex, Butler, Pennsylvania
|align=left|
|-align=center
|Loss
|34–4
|align=left| Marco Huck
|RTD
|9 
|01/05/2010
|align=left| Weser-Ems-Halle, Oldenburg
|align=left|
|-align=center
|Loss
|34–3
|align=left| Chris Arreola
|TKO
|4 
|05/12/2009
|align=left| Boardwalk Hall, Atlantic City, New Jersey
|align=left|
|-align=center
|Win
|34–2
|align=left| Donnell Holmes
|TD
|4 
|14/08/2009
|align=left| Pullman Park, Butler, Pennsylvania
|align=left|
|-align=center
|Win
|33–2
|align=left| Matthew Greer
|UD
|8
|17/04/2009
|align=left| Days Inn, Butler, Pennsylvania
|align=left|
|-align=center
|Win
|32–2
|align=left| Galen Brown
|TKO
|4 
|01/11/2008
|align=left| Morrow Arena, Slippery Rock, Pennsylvania
|align=left|
|-align=center
|Win
|31–2
|align=left| John Poore
|KO
|1 
|02/07/2008
|align=left| Pullman Park, Butler, Pennsylvania
|align=left|
|-align=center
|Win
|30–2
|align=left| Chad Van Sickle
|RTD
|1 
|27/04/2008
|align=left| Mountaineer Casino Racetrack and Resort, Chester, West Virginia
|align=left|
|-align=center
|Win
|29–2
|align=left| Byron Polley
|KO
|1 
|30/12/2007
|align=left| Mountaineer Casino Racetrack and Resort, Chester, West Virginia
|align=left|
|-align=center
|Win
|28–2
|align=left| Ray Lunsford
|TKO
|1 
|23/08/2007
|align=left| Mountaineer Casino Racetrack and Resort, Chester, West Virginia
|align=left|
|-align=center
|Loss
|27–2
|align=left| Luan Krasniqi
|UD
|12
|17/03/2007
|align=left| Hanns-Martin-Schleyer-Halle, Stuttgart
|align=left|
|-align=center
|Win
|27–1
|align=left| Axel Schulz
|TKO
|6 
|25/11/2006
|align=left| Gerry Weber Stadium, Halle
|align=left|
|-align=center
|Win
|26–1
|align=left| Andy Sample
|KO
|1 
|11/08/2006
|align=left| Mountaineer Casino Racetrack and Resort, Chester, West Virginia
|align=left|
|-align=center
|Win
|25–1
|align=left| Danny Batchelder
|UD
|10
|09/06/2006
|align=left| Tropicana Hotel & Casino, Atlantic City, New Jersey
|align=left|
|-align=center
|Win
|24–1
|align=left| Billy Zumbrun
|UD
|8
|28/04/2006
|align=left| Mohegan Sun Casino, Uncasville, Connecticut
|align=left|
|-align=center
|Win
|23–1
|align=left| Troy Weida
|TKO
|3 
|30/12/2005
|align=left| Mountaineer Casino Racetrack and Resort, Chester, West Virginia
|align=left|
|-align=center
|Win
|22–1
|align=left| Forrest Neal
|KO
|2 
|23/11/2005
|align=left| Mountaineer Casino Racetrack and Resort, Chester
|align=left|
|-align=center
|Win
|21–1
|align=left| Vinny Maddalone
|TKO
|7 
|01/10/2005
|align=left| St. Pete Times Forum, Tampa, Florida
|align=left|
|-align=center
|Win
|20–1
|align=left| Jermell Barnes
|UD
|8
|12/07/2005
|align=left| Days Inn, Butler, Pennsylvania, United States
|align=left|
|-align=center

References

External links

 
 Brian Minto Interview

1975 births
Boxers from Pennsylvania
Boxers trained by Kevin Barry
Living people
People from Butler, Pennsylvania
American male boxers
Heavyweight boxers